Warinanco Park (pronounced by locals as War-Rah-NINK-co) is a county park in Union County, New Jersey.

History

In 1921, a group of local citizens alarmed by the rapid industrialization of the area created the Union County Park Commission  by referendum vote of the people, to purchase and preserve remaining natural areas.

In 1923, the famous landscape design firm, the Olmsted Brothers (founded by their father Frederick Law Olmsted who designed New York's Central Park) completed its design plans for "Elizabeth Park," now known as "Warinanco."

Lenape namesake
This park, known for its beautiful views of green fields, was named in 1925 for an indigenous Lenape tribal leader of the region, whose name was recorded by English colonists as "Warinanco" in 1664. That year, a group called the Elizabethtown Associates bought the Elizabethtown Tract including land in today's Union County from Warinanco and another Lenape leader, Mattano.

Warinanco's name is recorded elsewhere as  "Waerhinnis Couwee," "Warrines" and "Wieronies." It is thought that Warinanco was a minor sachem, or tribal elder, of the Hackensack people (a band or subgroup among the Lenape).

Features and landmarks

Azalea Garden

The Caxton Brown Memorial Azalea Garden, located just south of the Warinanco Park Administration building. The garden is dedicated to the memory of Caxton Brown of Summit, New Jersey (1879-1952), who helped create, and was a member of, the Union County Park Commission. It contains hundreds of plants in many dozens of manicured beds. A boulder and plaque was dedicated in Brown's memory in the azalea garden in 1957.

Chatfield Garden

The Henry S. Chatfield Memorial Garden (also known as the Chatfield Garden). This area originally contained 14,200 tulips imported from Holland and planted in 21 beds but has been transitioned to more diverse blooms beyond tulips to support pollinators throughout the season.

It is named for the Union County Park Commission's first president Henry Summers Chatfield (1864-1933), who is memorialized with a stone bench in the tulip garden.

Union County Park Commission Administration Buildings

These historic buildings are listed on the state and the federal registers of historic places in 1985.

Track and field
There is a 400-meter long athletic track as well as a long jump track and a space for shot put. Inside of the athletic track there is an artificial-surface field that can be used for soccer, football, and other sports.

Magnolia Grove
A mature planting of a large number of flowering magnolia trees draws visitors every spring.

Warinanco Lake
A dock offers paddleboating.

Warinanco Park Sports Center
This sports center, including the Warinanco Ice Rink, was expanded and modernized in 2017.

Flora and fauna
Warinanco is known for its brightly colored springtime displays of cherry blossom, dogwood, redbud, and azalea blooms.

The impressive display of Japanese cherry blossoms surrounding Warinanco Lake dates back to 1931, where Caxton Brown and his brother donated them to the park.

Trees include:
Betula populifolia (gray birch)
Fagus grandifolia (American beech)
Juniperus virginiana (red cedar)
Liquidambar styraciflua(sweetgum)
Magnolia spp. (magnolia) planted
Picea abies (Norway spruce)
Pinus sp. (pine)
Pinus strobus (white pine)
Platanus occidentalis (American sycamore)
Prunus spp. (cherry)
Quercus alba (white oak)
Quercus palustris (pin oak)
Quercus rubra (red oak)
Tsuga canadensis (eastern hemlock)
Cercis canadensis (eastern redbud)

Shrubs include:
Pieris sp. (andromeda) planted
Rhododendron maximum (rosebay rhododendron) planted
Rhododendron spp. (azalea)
Taxus sp. (yew)

Herbs and flowers include:
Artemisia vulgaris (common mugwort)
Tulip (tulips) planted

See also
Watchung Reservation
Rahway River Parkway

References

Protected areas of Union County, New Jersey
Nature reserves in New Jersey
Geography of Elizabeth, New Jersey
Roselle, New Jersey
County parks in New Jersey
Parks in Union County, New Jersey
Landscape design history of the United States
Urban forests in the United States
Urban public parks